Magnus Knudsen (born 15 June 2001) is a Norwegian footballer who plays as a midfielder for Lillestrøm on loan from the Russian club Rostov.

Career
On 23 December 2021, Rostov announced the signing of Knudsen from Lillestrøm with a 4.5-year contract. On 24 March 2022, Knudsen returned to Lillestrøm on loan until 30 June 2022. On 7 July 2022, the loan was extended until 30 June 2023.

Career statistics

References

2001 births
Living people
Norwegian footballers
Norway youth international footballers
Association football midfielders
Lillestrøm SK players
Ullensaker/Kisa IL players
FC Rostov players
Eliteserien players
Norwegian First Division players
Russian Premier League players
Norwegian expatriate footballers
Norwegian expatriate sportspeople in Russia
Expatriate footballers in Russia